The non-marine molluscs of Portugal are a part of the molluscan fauna of Portugal.

There are numerous species of non-marine molluscs living in the wild in Portugal.

Freshwater gastropods 

Neritidae
 Theodoxus baeticus (Lamarck, 1822)

Bithyniidae
 Bithynia tentaculata (Linnaeus, 1758)

Hydrobiidae
 Alzoniella rolani (Boeters, 1986)
 Belgrandia alcoaensis C. Boettger, 1963 - endemic to Portugal
 Belgrandia alvaroi G. Holyoak, D. Holyoak & Mendes, 2017 - endemic to Portugal
 Belgrandia heussi C. Boettger, 1963 - endemic to Portugal
 Belgrandia jordaoi G. Holyoak, D. Holyoak & Mendes, 2017 - endemic to Portugal
 Belgrandia lusitanica (Paladilhe, 1867) - endemic to Portugal
 Belgrandia silviae Rolán & Oliveira, 2009 - endemic to Portugal
 Hydrobia glyca (Servain, 1880)
 Iberhoratia conimbrigensii Talaván Serna & Talaván Gómez, 2020 - endemic to Portugal
 Iberhoratia tagomei Talaván Serna, 2019 - endemic to Portugal
 Mercuria tachoensis (Frauenfeld, 1865) - endemic to Portugal

Tateidae
 Potamopyrgus antipodarum (Gray, 1843) - introduced

Valvatidae
 Valvata piscinalis (O.F. Müller, 1774)

Lymnaeidae
 Galba truncatula (O.F. Müller, 1774)
 Pseudosuccinea columella (Say, 1817) - introduced
 Radix auricularia (Linnaeus, 1758)
 Radix balthica (Linnaeus, 1758)
 Stagnicola palustris (O. F. Müller, 1774)

Physidae
 Physa acuta (Draparnaud, 1805) - introduced

Planorbidae
 Ancylus fluviatilis O.F. Müller, 1774
 Anisus spirorbis (Linnaeus, 1758)
 Bathyomphalus contortus (Linnaeus, 1758)
 Bulinus truncatus (Audouin, 1827)
 Ferrissia californica (Rowell, 1863) - introduced
 Gyraulus albus (O.F. Müller, 1774)
 Gyraulus chinensis (Dunker, 1848) - introduced
 Gyraulus crista (Linnaeus, 1758)
 Gyraulus laevis (Alder, 1838)
 Helisoma duryi (Wetherby, 1879) - introduced
 Hippeutis complanatus (Linnaeus, 1758)
 Menetus dilatatus (Gould, 1841) - introduced
 Planorbarius metidjensis (Forbes, 1838)
 Planorbis carinatus O.F. Müller, 1774
 Planorbis planorbis (Linnaeus, 1758)

Land gastropods 
Aciculidae
 Platyla lusitanica (D. Holyoak & Seddon, 1985) - endemic to Portugal

Pomatiidae
 Pomatias elegans (O.F. Müller, 1774)
 Tudorella sulcata (Draparnaud, 1805) - introduced

Ellobiidae
 Carychium ibazoricum Bank & E. Gittenberger, 1985
 Leucophytia bidentata (Montagu, 1808)
 Myosotella denticulata (Montagu, 1803)
 Ovatella firminii (Payraudeau, 1827)
 Pedipes dohrni d’Ailly, 1896
 Pseudomelampus exiguus (R.T. Lowe, 1832)

Succineidae
 Oxyloma elegans (Risso, 1826)
 Succinea spec. - introduced
 Succinella oblonga (Draparnaud, 1801)

Cochlicopidae
 Cochlicopa lubrica (O.F. Müller, 1774)
 Cochlicopa lubricella (Porro, 1838)

Chondrinidae
 Chondrina lusitanica (L. Pfeiffer, 1848) - endemic to Portugal
 Granopupa granum (Draparnaud, 1801)

Lauriidae
 Lauria cylindracea (Da Costa, 1778)
 Leiostyla anglica (A. Férussac, 1821)

Pyramidulidae
 Pyramidula jaenensis (Clessin, 1882)
 Pyramidula umbilicata (Montagu, 1803)

Valloniidae
 Acanthinula aculeata (O.F. Müller, 1774)
 Plagyrona angusta D. Holyoak & G. Holyoak, 2012 - introduced
 Plagyrona placida (Shuttleworth, 1852)
 Spermodea lamellata (Jeffreys, 1830)
 Vallonia costata (O.F. Müller, 1774)
 Vallonia pulchella (O.F. Müller, 1774)

Truncatellinidae
 Columella aspera Waldén, 1966
 Truncatellina beckmanni Quintana Cardona, 2010
 Truncatellina callicratis (Scacchi, 1833)

Vertiginidae
 Vertigo antivertigo (Draparnaud, 1801)
 Vertigo pygmaea (Draparnaud, 1801)

Enidae
 Merdigera obscura (O.F. Müller, 1774)

Clausiliidae
 Balea perversa (Linnaeus, 1758)
 Balea heydeni Maltzan, 1881
 Clausilia bidentata (Strøm, 1765)
 Macrogastra rolphii portensis (Luso da Silva, 1871) - endemic to Portugal

Ferussaciidae
 Cecilioides acicula (O.F. Müller, 1774)
 Cecilioides barbozae (Maltzan, 1886) - endemic to Portugal
 Cecilioides clessini (Maltzan, 1886) - endemic to Portugal
 Ferussacia folliculum (Schröter, 1784)

Achatinidae
 Rumina decollata (Linnaeus, 1758)

Testacellidae
 Testacella maugei A. Férussac, 1819

Discidae
 Discus rotundatus (O.F. Müller, 1774)

Helicodiscidae
 Lucilla singleyana (Pilsbry, 1889) - introduced

Punctidae
 Paralaoma servilis (Shuttleworth, 1852)
 Punctum pygmaeum (Draparnaud, 1801)

Euconulidae
 Euconulus alderi (Gray, 1840)
 Euconulus fulvus (O.F. Müller, 1774)

Gastrodontidae
 Aegopinella epipedostoma (Fagot, 1879)
 Aegopinella nitidula (Draparnaud, 1805)
 Aegopinella pura (Alder, 1830)
 Zonitoides arboreus (Say, 1816) - introduced
 Zonitoides nitidus (O.F. Müller, 1774)

Oxychilidae
 Mediterranea hydatina (Rossmässler, 1838)
 Morlina glabra (Rossmässler, 1835)
 Oxychilus alliarius (J.S. Miller, 1822)
 Oxychilus alpedrizensis Holyoak & Mendes, 2022 - endemic to Portugal
 Oxychilus cellarius (O.F. Müller, 1774)
 Oxychilus draparnaudi (Beck, 1837)

Pristilomatidae
 Hawaiia minuscula (Binney, 1841) - introduced
 Vitrea contracta (Westerlund, 1871)

Parmacellidae
 Drusia valenciennii (Webb & Van Beneden, 1836)

Agriolimacidae
 Deroceras agreste (Linnaeus, 1758)
 Deroceras invadens Reise, Hutchinson, Schunack & Schlitt, 2011 - introduced
 Deroceras laeve (O.F. Müller, 1774)
 Deroceras lombricoides (Morelet, 1845)
 Deroceras nitidum (Morelet, 1845)
 Deroceras panormitanum (Lessona & Pollonera, 1882) - introduced
 Deroceras reticulatum (O.F. Müller, 1774)
 Furcopenis circularis Castillejo & Mascato, 1987
 Furcopenis geresiensis (Rodríguez, Castillejo & Outeiro, 1989)

Limacidae
 Lehmannia marginata (O.F. Müller, 1774)
 Lehmannia valentiana (A. Férussac, 1821)
 Limacus flavus (Linnaeus, 1758)
 Limax maximus Linnaeus, 1758

Vitrinidae
 Oligolimax annularis (S. Studer, 1820)
 Vitrina pellucida (O.F. Müller, 1774)

Arionidae
 Arion ater (Linnaeus, 1758)
 Arion fuligineus Morelet, 1845
 Arion hispanicus Simroth, 1886
 Arion intermedius Normand, 1852
 Arion lusitanicus Mabille, 1868
 Arion nobrei Pollonera, 1889
 Geomalacus maculosus Allman, 1843
 Geomalacus anguiformis (Morelet, 1845)
 Geomalacus oliveirae Simroth, 1891

Geomitridae
 Backeljaia gigaxii (L. Pfeiffer, 1847)
 Candidula codia (Bourguignat, 1859) - endemic to Portugal
 Cochlicella acuta (O.F. Müller, 1774)
 Cochlicella barbara (Linnaeus, 1758)
 Cochlicella conoidea (dDraparnaud, 1801)
 Cernuella virgata (Da Costa, 1778)
 Helicella cistorum (Morelet, 1845)
 Microxeromagna lowei (Potiez & Michaud, 1838)
 Ponentina curtivaginata D. Holyoak & G. Holyoak, 2012 - endemic to Portugal
 Ponentina excentrica G. Holyoak & D. Holyoak, 2012
 Ponentina foiaensis G. Holyoak & D. Holyoak, 2012 - endemic to Portugal
 Ponentina grandiducta G. Holyoak & D. Holyoak, 2012 - endemic to Portugal
 Ponentina monoglandulosa D. Holyoak & G. Holyoak, 2012 - endemic to Portugal
 Ponentina octoglandulosa D. Holyoak & G. Holyoak, 2012
 Ponentina papillosa G. Holyoak & D. Holyoak, 2012
 Ponentina platylasia (Castro, 1887) - endemic to Portugal
 Ponentina ponentina (Morelet, 1845)
 Ponentina revelata (Michaud, 1831)
 Ponentina rosai (Castro, 1887)
 Xeroplexa arrabidensis (G. Holyoak & D. Holyoak, 2014) - endemic to Portugal
 Xeroplexa belemensis (Servain, 1880) - endemic to Portugal
 Xeroplexa carrapateirensis (G. Holyoak & D. Holyoak, 2014) - endemic to Portugal
 Xeroplexa coudensis (G. Holyoak & D. Holyoak, 2010) - endemic to Portugal
 Xeroplexa intersecta (Poiret, 1801)
 Xeroplexa olisippensis (Servain, 1880) - endemic to Portugal
 Xeroplexa ponsulensis (D. Holyoak & G. Holyoak, 2014) - endemic to Portugal
 Xeroplexa scabiosula (Locard, 1899)
 Xeroplexa setubalensis (Pfeiffer, 1850) - endemic to Portugal
 Xeroplexa strucki (Maltzan, 1886) - endemic to Portugal
 Xerosecta promissa (Westerlund, 1893)
 Xerosecta reboudiana (Bourguignat, 1863)
 Xerotricha apicina (Lamarck, 1822)
 Xerotricha conspurcata (Draparnaud, 1801)
 Xerotricha jamuzensis (E. Gittenberger & Manga, 1977)
 Xerotricha madritensis (Rambur, 1868)
 Xerotricha vatonniana (Bourguignat, 1867)

Helicidae
 Cepaea nemoralis (Linnaeus, 1758)
 Cornu aspersum (O.F. Müller, 1774)
 Eobania vermiculata (O.F. Müller, 1774) - introduced
 Helicigona lapicida (Linnaeus, 1758)
 Marmorana muralis (O. F. Müller, 1774) - introduced
 Otala lactea (O.F. Müller, 1774)
 Otala punctata (O. F. Müller, 1774) - introduced
 Theba pisana (O.F. Müller, 1774)
Theba pisana almogravensis D. Holyoak & G. Holyoak, 2016 - endemic to Portugal
Theba pisana pisana (O.F. Müller, 1774)

Hygromiidae
 Portugala inchoata (Morelet, 1845)
 Monacha cartusiana (O.F. Müller, 1774)

Trissexodontidae
 Caracollina lenticula (A. Férussac, 1821)
 Gasullia gasulli (Ortiz de Zárate Rocandio & Ortiz de Zárate López, 1961)
 Gasulliella simplicula (Morelet, 1845)
 Gittenbergeria turriplana (Morelet, 1845) - endemic to Portugal
 Oestophora barbella (Servain, 1880)
 Oestophora barbula (Rossmässler, 1838) - endemic to Portugal
 Oestophora barrelsi Hovestadt & Ripken, 2015 - endemic to Portugal
 Oestophora lusitanica (L. Pfeiffer, 1841)

Bivalvia
Margaritieridae
 Margaritifera margaritifera (Linnaeus, 1758)

Unionidae
 Anodonta anatina (Linnaeus, 1758)
 Anodonta cygnea (Linnaeus, 1758)
 Potomida littoralis (Cuvier, 1798)
 Unio delphinus Spengler, 1793
 Unio tumidiformis Castro, 1885

Cyrenidae
 Corbicula fluminea (O.F. Müller, 1774) - introduced

Sphaeriidae
 Euglesa casertana (Poli, 1791)
 Euglesa henslowana (Sheppard, 1823)
 Euglesa subtruncata (Malm, 1855)
 Musculium lacustre (O. F. Müller, 1774)
 Pisidium amnicum (O.F. Müller, 1774)
 Pisidium milium Held, 1836
 Pisidium nitidum Jenyns, 1832
 Pisidium obtusale (Lamarck, 1818)
 Pisidium personatum Malm, 1855
 Sphaerium corneum (Linnaeus, 1758)

See also

Lists of molluscs of surrounding countries:
 List of non-marine molluscs of Spain
 List of non-marine molluscs of Morocco

References

Molluscs
Portugal
Portugal
Port
Molluscs